Elias Peak (May 23, 1859 – December 17, 1916) was a Major League Baseball second baseman. He played for the 1884 Philadelphia Keystones and Boston Reds in the Union Association. He was still playing minor league ball as late as 1897.

He died in Philadelphia on December 17, 1916.

References

Major League Baseball second basemen
Philadelphia Keystones players
Boston Reds (UA) players
Baseball players from Philadelphia
19th-century baseball players
1859 births
1916 deaths
Bridgeport Giants players
Springfield (minor league baseball) players
Lynn (minor league baseball) players
Newburyport Clamdiggers players
Lynchburg (minor league baseball) players
Chattanooga Lookouts players
Minneapolis Millers (baseball) players
Duluth Freezers players
Eau Claire (minor league baseball) players
Sunbury (minor league baseball) players
Shamokin Maroons players
Charleston Seagulls players
Wheeling National Citys players
Wheeling Nailers (baseball) players
Toledo Maumees (minor league) players
Lancaster (minor league baseball) players
Shamokin Coal Heavers players